Jayson Palmgren (born April 11, 1989) is an American football offensive lineman for the Iowa Barnstormers of the Indoor Football League (IFL). He played college football at University of Missouri and attended North Kansas City High School in North Kansas City, Missouri. He has also been a member of the Cleveland Gladiators.

College career
Palmgren played for the Missouri Tigers from 2007 to 2011. He was the team's starter his final two years and helped the Tigers to 18 wins. He played in 35 games during his career including 26 starts at guard.

Professional career

Seattle Seahawks
After going undrafted in the 2012 NFL Draft, Palmgren was invited to rookie mini-camp with the Seattle Seahawks.

Iowa Barnstormers
In 2012, Palmgren was assigned to the Iowa Barnstormers of the Arena Football League. Palmgren started the final 8 games of the season for the Barnstormers. Mid-way through the 2013 season, Palmgren was placed on injured reserve for the rest of the season.

Pittsburgh Power
On November 23, 2013, Palmgren was assigned to the Pittsburgh Power. On June 9, 2014, Palmgren was placed on reassignment. Palmgren appeared in 8 games for the Power.

Cleveland Gladiators
Palmgren was assigned to the Cleveland Gladiators in 2015.

Kansas City Phantoms
Palmgren signed with the Kansas City Phantoms for the 2017 season. On March 7, 2017, the Phantoms placed Palmgren on suspension.

Return to Iowa
On March 6, 2017 Palmgren signed with the Iowa Barnstormers, whom had moved to the Indoor Football League (IFL). On October 5, 2017, Palmgren re-signed with the Barnstormers.

References

External links
Missouri Tigers profile

Living people
1989 births
Players of American football from Kansas City, Missouri
American football offensive linemen
Missouri Tigers football players
Iowa Barnstormers players
Cleveland Gladiators players
Kansas City Phantoms players